William Archibald McKenzie (31 January 1889 – 20 June 1983) was an Australian rules footballer who played with Melbourne in the Victorian Football League (VFL).

Notes

External links 

Bill McKenzie on Demonwiki

1889 births
1983 deaths
Australian rules footballers from Victoria (Australia)
Melbourne Football Club players